Crassispira sacerdotalis is a species of small predatory sea snail, a marine gastropod mollusk in the family  Pseudomelatomidae, the turrids and allies.

Description
The length of the shell attains 8 mm.

Distribution
This species is endemic to São Tomé and Príncipe.

References

 Rolàn, E. & Fernandes, F., 1993. - Aportaciones al conocimiento de la familia Turridae Swainson, 1840 (Molusca, Gastropoda) en las islas de Sâo Tomé y Principe (Golfo de Guinea). Nova Acta Cientifica Compostelana (Bioloxia) 3("1992"): 135-143

External links
 
 

sacerdotalis
Endemic fauna of São Tomé and Príncipe
Invertebrates of São Tomé and Príncipe
Gastropods described in 1992
Taxonomy articles created by Polbot